The NCAA Women's Division II Cross Country Championship is an annual cross country meet to decide the team and individual national champions of women's intercollegiate cross country running in the United States. It has been held every November since the NCAA began sponsoring women's sports in 1981. It is usually held at the same location as the NCAA Men's Division II Cross Country Championship.

The defending national teams champions are the Adams State Grizzlies, who won their twentieth national title in 2022. The Grizzlies' Stephanie Cotter, representing Adams State is the reigning individual champion, with a time of 19:45.2.

Format
The race field included 8 teams in 1981, 11 teams from 1982 to 1992 and 17 teams from 1993 to 1999. Beginning in 2000, the national championship race has included 24 teams. Teams compete in one of eight regional championships to qualify. In addition to the 24 teams, 16 individual runners qualify for the national championship.

Results
The race distance was 5,000 meters (5 kilometers) from 1981 to 1997 and 6,000 meters (6 kilometers) from 1997 to the present.

A † indicates a then-NCAA record-setting time for that particular distance.
A time highlighted in ██ indicates the all-time NCAA championship record for that distance.

Champions

Team titles by school

 Schools highlight in yellow have reclassified athletics from NCAA Division II.

See also
NCAA Women's Cross Country Championships (Division I, Division III)
NCAA Men's Cross Country Championships (Division I, Division II, Division III)
AIAW Intercollegiate Women's Cross Country Champions
NAIA Cross Country Championships (Men, Women)

References

External links
NCAA Women's Division II Cross Country

 Division II
Women's sports competitions in the United States
Cross country, women's
Women's athletics competitions